The men's decathlon at the 2010 African Championships in Athletics was held on July 28–29.

Medalists

Results

100 metres

Long jump

Shot put

High jump

400 metres

110 metres hurdles

Discus throw

Pole vault

Javelin throw

1500 metres

Final results

External links
Results

Decathlon
Combined events at the African Championships in Athletics